Alania Vladikavkaz are a Russian Football club which are based in Vladikavkaz. during the 2013-14 campaign they competed in the Russian National Football League, Russian Cup.

Russian National Football League

FC Spartak Vladikavkaz seasons
Alania